Laakkuluk Williamson Bathory or Laakkuluk, is a Kalaaleq (Greenlandic Inuk) performance artist, spoken word poet, actor, storyteller and writer based in Iqaluit, Nunavut. She is known for performing uaajeerneq, a Greenlandic mask dance that involves storytelling and centers three elements: fear, humour and sexuality. Bathory describes uaajeerneq as both a political and cultural act and an idiosyncratic art form.

Biography 
Born and raised in Saskatoon, Saskatchewan, Bathory is of Inuk and British ancestry. Her mother, Karla Williamson, was one of the original recreators of uaajeerneq in the 1970s Greenlandic folk movement after the dance form was nearly eradicated by colonial missionaries in Greenland in the 18th–20th centuries. Bathory started learning uaajeerneq when she was thirteen and trained and performed with her mother throughout her teenage years in Saskatoon. She currently resides in Iqaluit, Nunavut with her husband and three children.

Career

Artistic practice 
Bathory has been active in the Inuit, Indigenous, and Canadian art scenes since the 1990s and describes uaajeerneq as the cornerstone of her artistic practice. In an interview in March 2018 she explained: "[Uaajeerneq] makes me both open and brave to try new things, to dig deeper. I write poetry, tell stories, create theatre, performance art, video, and all of it has some sort of aspect of uaajeerneq to it." Bathory describes uaajeerneq as playing with "four main themes: our humility as human beings in the vastness of the universe and our connection to our ancestors, sex, fear, and hilarity", and said that she "[touches] on all these themes in a performance, sometimes all at once, sometimes moving abruptly between them".

In 2016, Bathory offered her film Timiga Nunalu, Sikulu (My Body, The Land and The Ice) as her contribution to #callresponse, a collaborative project by Indigenous women artists including Christi Belcourt (Métis), Maria Hupfield (Anishinaabe), Ursula Johnson (Mi'kmaq), and Tania Willard (Secwepemc). In the film, Bathory works to dismantle stereotypes of the "Pocahottie" and speaks back against consistent sexual violence perpetrated against Indigenous women. Selected representations of #callresponse projects were displayed at grunt gallery in Vancouver, BC in October–December 2016.

Bathory frequently collaborates with Inuk throat singer and recording artist Tanya Tagaq, including an appearance in Tagaq's 2016 music video for "Retribution" and a 2015 co-performance for #callresponse. The pair also performed together in March 2018 as part of the Beyond Worlds series presented by the Chan Centre for the Performing Arts. Of her experiences working with Tagaq, Bathory said in 2018: "Once we started performing together, we realized how much we sink and fly through the same realms of consciousness to create performance – her through her voice and me through my mask dancing. It is an incredible experience to perform together: we are unique from one another and heighten one another at the same time."

Qaggiavuut! Society 
Along with several other grassroots Inuit performing artists, Bathory is a founding member of the Qaggiavuut! Society for a Nunavut Performing Arts Centre, a community-based organization that supports Inuit artists and is working toward building a community-centered performing arts centre in Iqaluit. Qaggiavuut! Society has been operating as a volunteer organization since 2009, and in January 2016 won the Arctic Inspiration Prize – the first time an arts-based organization has ever won the prize. Beyond its goal of creating a Nunavut performing arts space, the organization also works to expand performing arts training for Inuit artists, to build economic opportunities for artists in the Arctic, to maintain at-risk Inuit performance art forms, and to nurture the creation of new Inuit performing arts work. Bathory began working as a program manager for the Qaggiavuut! Society in 2016.

Awards 
In 2021, Bathory won the Sobey Art Award, for which the Jury says her "performance practice courageously defies preconceived notions through embodied lived experience."

Performance works 
 Tulugak: Inuit Raven Stories, with Sylvia Cloutier, 2013
 Retribution, with Tanya Tagaq, 2016
 Kiviuq Returns, with Qaggiavuut! Society for a Nunavut Performing Arts Centre, 2017
 Visions and Dreams—Northern Light, CBC, VTPL, 2003
 Hunter's Journey—Dancing with Spirit TV series, Bravo, 2007
 Throat Song, Kajutaijuq, The Grizzlies (film)

Group exhibitions 
 The Fifth World, Kitchener–Waterloo Art Gallery, 2016
 Timiga Nunalu, Sikulu (film), for #callresponse, grunt gallery, 2016

Curation 
 Ilitarivingaa? exhibit, Art Gallery of Ontario, 2004
 Inuit Art in Motion exhibit, with Anna Hudson, Art Gallery of Ontario, 2003

Written works  
 "Talluriutiup Tariunga"—Oceans North Canada, 2015
 "We are a Nation of Lovers"—Up Here Magazine, 2015
 "Dog Children"—The North-South Project: An Anthology of the Lost, 2015
 From the Moon to the Belly postcard project, with Maria Hupfield, 2012
 "How Akutaq Came to Be"—Pith and Wry, 2011
 "Aqausiit: Can You Hear How Much Love You Evoke In Me?!"—Native Studies Review 20(2), 2011
 "Inuit gender parity and why it was not accepted in the Nunavut legislature"—Études huit 30(1), 2006

References

External links 
 https://www.qaggiavuut.ca/ ᖃᒡᒋᐊᕘᑦ! Qaggiavuut! 
 http://www.callresponseart.ca/ #callresponse

1979 births
Living people
Artists from Saskatoon
Inuit artists
Dora Mavor Moore Award winners
Canadian women dramatists and playwrights
Canadian women artists
Canadian Inuit women
Writers from Saskatoon
21st-century Canadian women writers
21st-century Canadian dramatists and playwrights